Adolf "Adsch" Friedrich August Werner (19 October 1886 in Kiel – 6 September 1975) was a German amateur football player.

Club career 
With his club Holstein Kiel he won the German football championship in 1912.

International career 
Werner competed in the 1912 Summer Olympics. As member of the German Olympic squad and he played two matches in the consolation tournament as goalkeeper. Overall he won 13 caps for Germany.

References

External links
 
 
 
 

1886 births
1975 deaths
German footballers
Germany international footballers
Association football goalkeepers
Olympic footballers of Germany
Footballers at the 1912 Summer Olympics
Holstein Kiel players
German footballers needing infoboxes
Sportspeople from Kiel